Pelagicola litoralis is a Gram-negative, strictly aerobic and non-motile  bacterium from the genus of Pelagicola which has been isolated from coastal water from the Sea of Japan (East Sea) from Korea.

References

Rhodobacteraceae
Bacteria described in 2008